is  the former head coach of the Mitsubishi Electric in the Japanese JBL.

Head coaching record

|-
| style="text-align:left;"|Mitsubishi Electric
| style="text-align:left;"|2006-07
| 24||17||7|||| style="text-align:center;"| 1st|||7||6||1||
| style="text-align:center;"|Runners-up in JBL
|-
| style="text-align:left;"|Mitsubishi Electric
| style="text-align:left;"|2007-08
| 35||18||17|||| style="text-align:center;"| 4th|||2||0||2||
| style="text-align:center;"|4th
|-
| style="text-align:left;"|Mitsubishi Electric
| style="text-align:left;"|2008-09
| 35||8||27|||| style="text-align:center;"| 8th|||-||-||-||
| style="text-align:center;"|8th
|-
| style="text-align:left;"|Mitsubishi Electric
| style="text-align:left;"|2009-10
| 42||8||34|||| style="text-align:center;"| 8th|||-||-||-||
| style="text-align:center;"|8th
|-

References

1970 births
Living people
Japanese basketball coaches
Nagoya Diamond Dolphins coaches
Nagoya Diamond Dolphins players
Niigata Albirex BB players